Mohamed Naouar (born 9 July 1965) is a Tunisian wrestler. He competed at the 1992 Summer Olympics and the 1996 Summer Olympics.

References

1965 births
Living people
Tunisian male sport wrestlers
Olympic wrestlers of Tunisia
Wrestlers at the 1992 Summer Olympics
Wrestlers at the 1996 Summer Olympics
Place of birth missing (living people)
20th-century Tunisian people